Nyctemera luzonica is a moth of the family Erebidae first described by Charles Swinhoe in 1917. It is found in the Philippines (Luzon, Mindanao, Bohol, Cebu, Leyte, Negros, Samar, Sibuyan).

Subspecies
Nyctemera luzonica luzonica (Philippines: Luzon, Mindanao, Bohol, Cebu, Leyte, Negros, Samar, Sibuyan)
Nyctemera luzonica plesiastes (West, 1932) (Philippines: northern Luzon)

References

Nyctemerina
Moths described in 1917